Fretwell is a surname which may refer to:

David Fretwell (born 1952), English footballer
Des Fretwell (born 1955), British cyclist
Elbert K. Fretwell (1878–1962), American professor of education
Elbert K. Fretwell Jr. (1923–2012), American academic and university chancellor
Elizabeth Fretwell (1920–2006), Australian soprano
Sir John Fretwell (1930–2017), British diplomat
Stephen Fretwell (born 1981), English singer-songwriter